Max Vuyisile Sisulu (born 23 August 1945) is a South African politician who was Speaker of the National Assembly of South Africa from 2009 to 2014. He was elected to the position on 6 May 2009, succeeding Gwen Mahlangu-Nkabinde and becoming the first male post-apartheid speaker of the National Assembly.  He is also the first Black male to become speaker.

Following the 2014 General Elections, Sisulu was replaced by Baleka Mbete as Speaker of the National Assembly.

He is a member of the African National Congress (ANC).  Sisulu is the son of Walter and Albertina Sisulu, both prominent anti-apartheid activists in the ANC.

Education
Sisulu has been a member of the National Working Committee, a member of the Finance Commission and responsible for ANC economic transformation for 10 years. He holds a master's degree in economics from the Plekhanov Russian University of Economics in Moscow and a master's degree in public administration from the Kennedy School of Government at Harvard University. He participated in the prestigious Govan Mbeki Research Fellowship at the University of Amsterdam, the Netherlands.

References

Living people
African National Congress politicians
Xhosa people
Speakers of the National Assembly of South Africa
1945 births
Plekhanov Russian University of Economics alumni
Harvard Kennedy School alumni